Tim Fourie is a South Africa former rugby footballer who represented South Africa in rugby league at the 1995 World Cup.

Playing career
Fourie played for the South African Rhinos in the 1995 World Cup, playing in all three matches.

In 1996, he spent the season at the Dewsbury Rams, along with several other South African World Cup players. Despite the hype surrounding their arrival, the imports failed to make a lasting impression at the club.

He participated in the 1997 Super League World Nines for South Africa.

Between 1998 and 2000, he played rugby union for the Leeds Tykes.

He later captained Sedgley Park RUFC and then played for Rossendale RUFC.

References

1968 births
Living people
Dewsbury Rams players
Expatriate rugby league players in England
Expatriate rugby union players in England
Leeds Tykes players
Rugby league centres
Sportspeople from Port Elizabeth
Rugby league players from Eastern Cape
Rugby league second-rows
Rugby union locks
Rugby union players from Port Elizabeth
South Africa national rugby league team players
South African expatriate rugby league players
South African expatriate rugby union players
South African expatriate sportspeople in England
South African rugby league players
South African rugby union players